Charles Henry "Chip" Reid Jr. was named CBS News National correspondent in June 2011. Prior to his current position, he was the Chief White House Correspondent for CBS News. He assumed that position on January 5, 2009.

Previously, Reid was the network's congressional correspondent. Prior to his association with CBS, he was employed by NBC News, where he covered politics and Capitol Hill.

Education
Reid was educated at Concord High School, a public secondary school in Wilmington, Delaware, followed by Vassar College, a private liberal arts college in the town of Poughkeepsie in New York state, from which he graduated Phi Beta Kappa with a degree in psychology in 1977.  He then attended Princeton University in Princeton, New Jersey, in 1982, graduating with a Master's of Public Affairs degree. He received a law degree from Columbia Law School.

Reid gave the commencement address to the Vassar College Class of 2011.

Life and career

Legal
Reid practiced law, as a Counsel to the U.S. Senate Judiciary Committee from 1982 through 1986. He then served as a specialist in litigation, and lobbying from 1986 to 1988.

Journalism

ABC
Reid began his network journalism career at ABC News as a field producer in Washington. He worked for ABC from 1988 to 1989.

TV Reporter
Reid began his journalism career working for WTTG-TV in Washington from 1990-93. He moved to WJLA-TV from 1994-96.

NBC

From 1996 through 2000, Reid was based in Washington, D.C. for NBC; covering among other beltway stories, Al Gore's 2000 Presidential campaign, voting irregularities of the 2000 Presidential election, and the impeachment process of then President Clinton.

Starting in 2001, Reid began working for the Los Angeles base of NBC, spending 7 weeks with a U.S. Marines lead unit during the initial invasion of U.S. troops from Kuwait to Baghdad. After Sept. 11, 2001 attacks, Reid reported from Ground Zero and from the Pentagon, as well as covering stories on the war on terror from Afghanistan, Israel, Uzbekistan, Egypt, and around the world. He continued reporting in this capacity through 2003.

Reid began covering the Senate and the House of Representatives for NBC News in the fall of 2004; and, he served as a political coverage anchor for MSNBC, as well as a reporter for all the major NBC News broadcasts.

CBS
Reid joined CBS News in 2007 as Capitol Hill Correspondent, extensively covering the 2008 presidential campaign. He also traveled with Sen. John McCain during much of the campaign.

Personal life
Reid was born in Wilmington, Delaware, to Charles H. Reid Sr. and Norma Reid. He and his wife Nina Black live in Washington, D.C.

References

External links

American television reporters and correspondents
Year of birth missing (living people)
Living people
Princeton University alumni
Columbia Law School alumni
Vassar College alumni
People from Wilmington, Delaware
CBS News people